Dave Zelenock is an American college volleyball coach, currently serving as head coach of The Citadel Bulldogs women's volleyball team.  He previously served as head coach at Tennessee Tech.

Zelenock was a club volleyball player at Central Michigan University.  After graduation, he served as an assistant for one year at Northwood before moving to Delaware State for two years.  Next, he returned to his alma mater, where he worked for six years and gained responsibilities for scouting and recruiting.  He earned his first head coaching position at Tennessee Tech, where he served for five years before moving to The Citadel.

In his fourth season with the Bulldogs, Zelenock led the team to its first-ever Southern Conference title in a women's team sport and their first NCAA berth.

Head coaching record

References

Living people
Central Michigan University alumni
Central Michigan Chippewas women's volleyball coaches
The Citadel Bulldogs women's volleyball coaches
Delaware State Hornets women's volleyball coaches
Northwood Timberwolves women's volleyball coaches
Tennessee Tech Golden Eagles women's volleyball coaches
Year of birth missing (living people)